Jill Jamie Roord (born 22 April 1997) is a Dutch professional footballer who plays as a midfielder for Frauen-Bundesliga club VfL Wolfsburg and the Netherlands national team. She previously played for Arsenal in the English Women’s Super League, Bayern Munich in the German Frauen-Bundesliga and won multiple Dutch national titles with FC Twente in the top Dutch league. During the 2015–16 Eredivisie season, she was the top scorer in the league.

In 2017, Roord represented the Netherlands in their victorious UEFA Women's Euro 2017 campaign and competed at the 2019 FIFA Women's World Cup in France two years later at the age of 22.

Early life
Born and raised in Oldenzaal, a city in the eastern province of Overijssel, Jill's father is former Dutch footballer, René Roord. Her mother played basketball. As a young child, Roord was always playing football outside with boys, her friends and brothers before and after school. She joined a club for the first time at age five. Her idol was Ronaldinho.

Club career

FC Twente, 2013–2017
Roord started her career in 2008 at the under-13 team of FC Twente and quickly progressed through the youth teams. At the age of 16 she made her debut in the first team. She helped the team to win the  BeNe League (Belgian and Dutch leagues combined in a single League played between 2012 and 2015) twice, the Eredivisie (Dutch League) once and the KNVB Women's Cup (Dutch Cup) once. Also with the club she made her debut at the UEFA Women's Champions League in 2013. On 1 April 2017, she played her 100th match for the club.

Bayern Munich, 2017–2019

Ahead of the 2017–18 season, Roord signed a two-year contract with Bayern Munich to play in Germany's top league, Frauen-Bundesliga. On 2 September 2017, she made her debut for the club in a 3–0 win over SGS Essen. On 15 October 2017, she scored her first goal in a 2–0 home victory against SC Sand. During her first season with the club, Roord scored six goals in the 17 games in which she played. Bayern Munich finished in second place during the regular season with a  record. Her six goals tied with two other players as the third top goal scorers on the team.

On 4 October 2017, Roord made her first UEFA Women's Champions League appearance for the club in a 1–0 away loss to Chelsea.

During the 2018–19 season, Roord scored 7 goals in 19 appearances for Bayern Munich. Early in the season, head coach Thomas Wörle was quoted, "You can already say that Jill is one of the greatest talents in Europe. In the past six months, she has been extremely tough, scoring and preparing a lot of goals." Bayern Munich finished in second place with a  record.  On 5 May 2019, Roord announced she would be leaving Bayern München at the end of the season. Nine days later, her signing with Arsenal was announced.

Arsenal, 2019–2021

Roord signed with Arsenal on 14 May 2019. During a friendly match against Tottenham Hotspur, she scored a hat-trick lifting Arsenal to a 6–0 win. Roord scored two goals in the fourteen games in which she played during the 2019–20 FA WSL season. Arsenal finished in third place during the regular season with a  record and were runners-up for the league cup after being defeated by Chelsea 2–1 during the final.

During the 2020–21 FA WSL season, Roord scored two consecutive hat-tricks in the team's season-opening matches again Reading and West Ham United. She was named Player of the Month for September by the league and the first women's footballer ever to be named in the DAZN European Team of the Week. She sat out some games due to a knee injury she endured during an international match against Russia.

VfL Wolfsburg, 2021–present 
On 10 May 2021, It was announced that Roord would be joining Frauen-Bundesliga side VfL Wolfsburg in the summer from Arsenal for an undisclosed fee, Roord signed a contract with Wolfsburg until 2024. On 12 September Roord scored her first goal for VfL Wolfsburg in a league match against SC Sand a game they would win 4-0.

International career

Roord has represented the Netherlands on the senior national team and various youth national teams including the under-19, under-17, under-16, and under-15 squads. Roord completed at and won the UEFA Women's Under-19 Championship in 2014.

Senior national team, 2015–present 
She made her debut for the senior team on 7 February 2015 during a match against Thailand. In May 2015, she was named to the 23-player roster called to represent Netherlands at the 2015 FIFA Women's World Cup. In June 2017, she was in the 23-player squad that won the UEFA Women's Euro 2017, a historical first for the Netherlands. After the tournament ended, Roord and her teammates were honoured by the Prime Minister and the Minister of Sport and made Knights of the Order of Orange-Nassau.

2019–20: FIFA Women's Cup and UEFA Women's Euro 2022 qualifying

In 2019, Roord was called to represent the Netherlands in the 2019 FIFA Women's World Cup in France.  She scored the Netherlands' game-winning goal during the team's first match of the tournament against New Zealand, marking the first Netherlands goal at the tournament. Her 92nd-minute goal after being subbed cemented the foundation for the Netherlands' group E lead. During the team's second group stage match against Cameroon, Roord was subbed in the 71st minute during the Netherlands' 3–1 win. After the Dutch defeated Canada 2–1 and finished at the top of Group E, they advanced to the knockout stage where they defeated 2011 champions, Japan 2–1, with Roord subbing in the 87th minute.  Roord subbed in during the 87th minute of the team's quarterfinal win against Italy and advanced to the semifinals – a first in the Netherlands team's history. During the semi-final match against Sweden, Roord played in the defender position in front of 48,452 spectators in Lyon. The defense kept a clean sheet and the Netherlands won 1–0 advancing to the final against 2015 champions, the United States. Roord subbed in during the 66th minute of the Final after the United States took a 2–0 lead and eventual win.

Roord was named to the squad for UEFA Women's Euro 2022 qualifying matches (2021 was postponed due to the COVID-19 pandemic). During a match against Estonia on 30 August 2019, she scored the Netherlands' second goal of the team's 7–0 win. Roord scored the Netherlands' game-winning goal in the 1–0 win against Russia on 18 September further cementing the team's place at the UEFA Women's Euro 2022.

Career statistics
Scores and results list the Netherlands' goal tally first, score column indicates score after each Roord goal.

Honours
FC Twente
 BeNe League: 2012–13, 2013–14
 Eredivisie: 2012–13*, 2013–14*, 2014–15*, 2015–16
 Eredivisie topscorer: 2015–16
 KNVB Women's Cup: 2014–15
*During the BeNe League period (2012 to 2015), the highest placed Netherlands team is considered as national champion by the Royal Dutch Football Association.

Arsenal
 FA Women's League Cup runners-up: 2020

Netherlands U19
 UEFA Women's Under-19 Championship: 2014

Netherlands
UEFA Women's Euro: 2017
Algarve Cup: 2018
 FIFA Women's World Cup: 2019 runners-up

Individual
 WSL Player of the Month: September 2020
 DAZN European Team of the Week

See also
 List of FA WSL hat-tricks
 List of association football families
 List of foreign FA Women's Super League players

References

Further reading
 Grainey, Timothy (2012), Beyond Bend It Like Beckham: The Global Phenomenon of Women's Soccer, University of Nebraska Press, 
 Postma, Annemarie (2017), De Oranje leeuwinnen: het Nederlands vrouweneftal, Ambo/Anthos B.V., 
 Stay, Shane (2019), The Women's World Cup 2019 Book: Everything You Need to Know About the Soccer World Cup, Books on Demand, 
 Theivam, Keiran and Jeff Kassouf (2019), The Making of the Women's World Cup: Defining stories from a sport’s coming of age, Little, 
 Vissers, Willem (2019), Meisjesdromenvan: EK-debuut tot WK-finale in tien jaar, Overamstel Uitgevers,

External links

 
 Profile  at onsoranje.nl
 Profile at arsenal.com
 Profile  at Onsoranje.nl (archived)
 Profile  at vrouwenvoetbalnederland.nl
 
 Eurosport profile
 Soccerdonna.de profile (in German)

1997 births
Living people
People from Oldenzaal
Dutch women's footballers
Netherlands women's international footballers
Dutch expatriate sportspeople in Germany
Expatriate women's footballers in Germany
Eredivisie (women) players
Frauen-Bundesliga players
FC Twente (women) players
FC Bayern Munich (women) players
Women's association football midfielders
2015 FIFA Women's World Cup players
UEFA Women's Championship-winning players
Knights of the Order of Orange-Nassau
2019 FIFA Women's World Cup players
Arsenal W.F.C. players
Women's Super League players
Dutch expatriate sportspeople in England
Expatriate women's footballers in England
Dutch expatriate women's footballers
Footballers at the 2020 Summer Olympics
Olympic footballers of the Netherlands
VfL Wolfsburg (women) players
UEFA Women's Euro 2022 players
Footballers from Overijssel
UEFA Women's Euro 2017 players